Haley Michelle Ramm (born March 26, 1992) is an American actress. She is known for her roles as Jen Long in the police procedural series Without a Trace (2007–2008), Brenna Carver in the ABC Family drama Chasing Life (2014–2015), and Violet Simmons in the supernatural thriller web series Light as a Feather (2018–2019).

Early life
Ramm was born in Collin County, Texas. At the age of three, she began dancing in local studios. At age nine, she began booking roles in indies and shorts. She has appeared in nationwide commercials for Hasbro and Dell Computers. She was featured on the May and June issues of American Girl in 2002. Ramm moved to Los Angeles at age 11 with her mother; her father and brother stayed behind in Texas for the first few years.

Career
After moving to Los Angeles, Ramm booked guest roles on CSI: Crime Scene Investigation and Yes, Dear, and landed the role of Brittany Loud in the 2005 film Flightplan. She appeared in the 2005 film Yours, Mine & Ours. The same year, Ramm was cast as a younger version of Jennifer Aniston's character in Rumor Has It..., and while her scenes did not make the final cut after the script was rewritten, she can be seen in various still photographs throughout the film.

In 2006, she appeared in X-Men: The Last Stand as the young Jean Grey. In 2007, Ramm was in the movie Mr. Blue Sky as Jessica Green, and appeared as Samantha Jensen in Walking Tall: Lone Justice. In 2007, she also appeared as the young Carine in the feature film Into the Wild, and in the role of Gwen Tennyson in the television film Ben 10: Race Against Time.

From 2007 to 2008, Ramm appeared in a recurring role on the series Without a Trace, and again in a 2009 episode of iCarly with her real-life friend Miranda Cosgrove. Ramm appeared in the 2010 French horror film Rubber as Fiona. In 2011, Ramm was featured in the MTV television film Worst. Prom. Ever., and portrayed victim Jessica Hamilton in the video game L.A. Noire. In 2012, Ramm was cast in the film Disconnect playing the character of Jason Bateman's daughter.

In 2013, Ramm was cast in a main role on the ABC Family drama Chasing Life, playing Brenna Carver, the younger sister of the lead character played by Italia Ricci. In 2015 she was cast as the witch Ariane who appeared in two episodes of The Originals.

Filmography

Film

Television

Video game 
 L.A. Noire (2011), as Jessica Hamilton (voice role)

References

External links
 

1992 births
21st-century American actresses
Actresses from Texas
American child actresses
American film actresses
American television actresses
American voice actresses
Living people
People from Collin County, Texas